The 1958 New Zealand Grand Prix was a motor race held at the Ardmore Circuit on 11 January 1958. Jack Brabham would take a comfortable victory ahead of Ross Jensen and Ron Roycroft. This made Brabham the first Australian to win the New Zealand Grand Prix, and the first of three occasions in which he would win the event.

Local hero Bruce McLaren encountered gearbox troubles before the race had even begun, joining the race half a minute behind the pack. Despite the efforts put forth by his mechanics to make this happen, he would retire four laps from the end, with the gearbox issues still plaguing his car.

Classification

References

New Zealand Grand Prix
Grand Prix
January 1958 sports events in New Zealand